Nadezhda Vasileva (born 25 June 1937) is a Bulgarian cross-country skier. She competed at the 1960, 1964 and the 1968 Winter Olympics.

References

External links
 

1937 births
Living people
Bulgarian female cross-country skiers
Olympic cross-country skiers of Bulgaria
Cross-country skiers at the 1960 Winter Olympics
Cross-country skiers at the 1964 Winter Olympics
Cross-country skiers at the 1968 Winter Olympics
Sportspeople from Sofia